Shahrak-e Shahid Sharaft (also Romanized as Shahrak-e Shahīd Sharāft) is a village in Sardarabad Rural District, in the Central District of Shushtar County, Khuzestan Province, Iran. At the 2006 census, its population was 9,185, in 1,687 families.

References 

Populated places in Shushtar County